Balor Lilbon Moore (born January 25, 1951) is an American former professional baseball player. He played in the Major League Baseball as a left-handed pitcher between 1970 and 1980. He was the first player drafted by the Montreal Expos expansion team in the 1969 Major League Baseball draft (22nd overall). He also played for the California Angels and the Toronto Blue Jays.

Expos phenom
Moore went a combined 9-1 with a 0.41 earned run average in the Gulf Coast League and Florida State League in his first professional baseball season, at the Rookie and High A levels. After going 3–0 with a 0.72 ERA for the High A West Palm Beach Expos to start the  season, Moore made the jump all the way to the Triple A Buffalo Bisons. He made his major league debut at the age of 19 on May 21, 1970 against the Pittsburgh Pirates. He faced one batter, Willie Stargell, who lined out to left field. Moore pitched a total of 9.2 innings in the majors that season, going 0–2 with a 7.45 ERA.

Montreal Expos
Moore was roughed up in his first four starts, going 0–3 with a 6.45 ERA. He turned his season around on July 14 with a complete game 9–1 victory over the Los Angeles Dodgers. From there, Moore went 9–6 with a 2.94 ERA, including a 25 inning scoreless-inning streak broken on September 16 by Philadelphia Phillies rookie Mike Schmidt's first major league home run. For the season, the left-hander made 22 starts and struck out 161 hitters in 147.2 innings.

That winter he pitched a perfect game for San Juan in Puerto Rico, the first nine-inning perfect game in that league's 36-year history. Still Moore struck out an average of 7.71 batters per nine innings, second in the National League, and held batters to a .233 batting average, tenth in the league.

Later career
He went 0–3 with a 10.20 ERA in six rehab appearances with the Triple A Memphis Blues before undergoing major elbow surgery during that off-season.

He was 1–3 with a 4.00 ERA for Memphis when his contract was sold to the California Angels. After just one season in California, Moore's contract was sold to the Toronto Blue Jays.

Moore spent the final three seasons of his career with the Blue Jays, going 12–17 with a 4.96 ERA. He pitched four innings to earn the only save of his career on April 27,  against the Milwaukee Brewers. He spent  in the minors with the Brewers and Houston Astros before officially retiring.

Career stats

Moore had a 40–58 record and 4.01 ERA in eleven minor league seasons. He went into the steel business after his baseball career ended, and currently owns Brittex Pipe Company in Houston, Texas.

References

External links
, or Baseball Almanac, or Retrosheet, or Balor Moore - Baseballbiography.com

1951 births
Living people
Baseball players from Texas
American expatriate baseball players in Canada
Buffalo Bisons (minor league) players
California Angels players
El Paso Diablos players
Florida Instructional League Expos players
Gulf Coast Expos players
Major League Baseball pitchers
Memphis Blues players
Montreal Expos players
Peninsula Whips players
People from Smithville, Texas
Québec Carnavals players
Salinas Angels players
Salinas Packers players
Salt Lake City Gulls players
Syracuse Chiefs players
Tigres de Aragua players
American expatriate baseball players in Venezuela
Toronto Blue Jays players
Tucson Toros players
Vancouver Canadians players
West Palm Beach Expos players
Winnipeg Whips players